The Martyrdom of Saint Lawrence is a 1558 painting by Titian, now in the church of I Gesuiti in Venice. It so impressed Philip II of Spain that he commissioned a second version in 1567 for the basilica at El Escorial.

Religious paintings by Titian
Paintings about death
1558 paintings